Chlorochroa faceta is a species of stink bug in the family Pentatomidae. It is found in Central America and North America.

References

 Henry, Thomas J., and Richard C. Froeschner (1992). Corrections and additions to the "Catalog of the Heteroptera, or True Bugs, of Canada and the Continental United States". Proceedings of the Entomological Society of Washington, vol. 94, no. 2, 263–272.
 Thomas J. Henry, Richard C. Froeschner. (1988). Catalog of the Heteroptera, True Bugs of Canada and the Continental United States. Brill Academic Publishers.

Further reading

 

Insects described in 1825
Pentatomini